Same Girl may refer to:
"Same Girl" (R. Kelly and Usher song), 2007
"Same Girl" (Jennifer Lopez song), 2014
Same Girl (Na Yoon-sun album), 2010
Same Girl (Twila Paris album), 1987
Same Girl, a 2004 album by Trina Broussard
"Same Girl", a song by Randy Newman on his 1983 album Trouble in Paradise